Wang Ting is a Paralympian athlete from China competing mainly in category F54-56 discus throw events.

She competed in the 2004 Summer Paralympics in Athens, Greece. There she won a gold medal in the women's F54/55 discus throw event.  She failed, however, to win a medal in either of the shot put or javelin throw.

She competed in the 2008 Summer Paralympics in Beijing, China in an attempt to defend her title. However, she only won a silver medal in the women's F54-56 discus throw event.

External links
 

Paralympic athletes of China
Athletes (track and field) at the 2004 Summer Paralympics
Athletes (track and field) at the 2008 Summer Paralympics
Paralympic gold medalists for China
Paralympic silver medalists for China
Living people
Chinese female discus throwers
Medalists at the 2004 Summer Paralympics
Medalists at the 2008 Summer Paralympics
Year of birth missing (living people)
Paralympic medalists in athletics (track and field)
21st-century Chinese women